Asylet is the popular name of a building located at Grønland 28 in Oslo, Norway.

History
Asylet was built as a merchant yard around 1730 with an annex added in 1798. The two story building was constructed of notched timber, with half-timbered and modified brick-faced facade facing the street. Two perpendicular wings create a courtyard which is paved with small stones.

From 1839 to 1865, the house was used as a child's asylum, (hence the name, which means asylum in English). It has also served as a courthouse and bank division (Akers Sparebank 1844 and Spareskillingsbanken 1851).

From 1868 to 1903 it housed a facility operated by Krohgstøttens Hospital (Krohgstøttens sykehus). 
During the period 1903–1965, the building housed a nursing home. The building was conserved in 1967 and since 1992 has been the site of various offices and shops. Today, the building also houses Kafe Asylet, a café and restaurant with rental space and outdoor seating.

References

External links 
Asylet website

Commercial buildings completed in 1730
Buildings and structures in Oslo
1730 establishments in Norway
Restaurants in Oslo